The Municipality of Hoče–Slivnica is a municipality south of Maribor in northeastern Slovenia. Its administrative seat is Spodnje Hoče.

Geography
The area is part of the traditional region of Lower Styria. It is now included in the Drava Statistical Region. The municipality extends from the flatlands on the right bank of the Drava River into the Pohorje Hills. The motorway and railway line from Ljubljana to Maribor run through the municipality.

Settlements
In addition to the municipal seat of Spodnje Hoče, the municipality also includes the following settlements:

 Bohova
 Čreta
 Hočko Pohorje
 Hotinja Vas
 Orehova Vas
 Pivola
 Polana
 Radizel
 Rogoza
 Slivnica pri Mariboru
 Slivniško Pohorje
 Zgornje Hoče

References

External links
 
 Municipality of Hoče–Slivnica on Geopedia
 Municipality of Hoče–Slivnica website

 
1998 establishments in Slovenia
Hoce-Slivnica